The 2012 U.S. Olympic gymnastics team trials were held from June 29 through July 1, 2012, at the HP Pavilion (now known as SAP Center) in San Jose, California.

Venue 
The SAP Center, formally known as HP Pavilion, has a capacity of up to 19,190 spectators for concerts, is home to the National Hockey League team, the San Jose Sharks.

Participants

Women 
The top 8 finishers from the 2012 VISA Championships received automatic berth to the trials.

The following people successfully petitioned their way to Olympic trials:

Men

Broadcast 
NBC broadcast both nights of competition at trials.

Results

Final standings

Final Scores
Full Olympic Trial scores are as follows:

Olympic Team selection 

Gabby Douglas, McKayla Maroney, Aly Raisman, Kyla Ross, and Jordyn Wieber were selected to represent the United States at the 2012 Summer Olympics in London, England.  Anna Li, Sarah Finnegan, and Elizabeth Price were selected as the alternates.

For the men's team Danell Leyva and John Orozco automatically earned Olympic berths by finishing first and second in the all-around and recording three or more top three finishes in the individual event standings.  The men's selection team also named Jake Dalton, Jonathan Horton, and Sam Mikulak to the team.  The replacement athletes selected were Chris Brooks, Alex Naddour, and Steven Legendre.

References 

United States Olympic trials
Gymnastics
2012 in sports in California
Gymnastics at the 2012 Summer Olympics